The 1919 Coburg state election was held on 9 February 1919 to elect the 11 members of the Landtag of the Free State of Coburg.

Results

References 

Coburg
Elections in Baden-Württemberg